Edward B. Seymour House is a historic home located on the Germantown-Mount Airy neighborhood boundary of Philadelphia, Pennsylvania. It was built in 1891, and is a -story, Wissahickon schist and shingle dwelling in the Queen Anne-style. It features a rounded corner tower topped by a conical roof and a stepped gable. The house was designed by gilded age architect, Horace Trumbauer. Also on the property is a contributing garage, built in 1909.

It was added to the National Register of Historic Places in 1987.

References

Houses on the National Register of Historic Places in Philadelphia
Queen Anne architecture in Pennsylvania
Houses completed in 1891
Mount Airy, Philadelphia
Horace Trumbauer buildings